Ahlfeldite is a mineral of secondary origin. It is named after Friedrich Ahlfeld (1892–1982), a German-Bolivian mining engineer and geologist. Its type locality is Virgen de Surumi mine, Pakajake Canyon, Chayanta Province, Potosí Department, Bolivia.

References 

Nickel minerals
Cobalt minerals
Monoclinic minerals
Minerals in space group 11